Friezland Wood is a woodland in Kent, England, near Tunbridge Wells. It is owned and managed by the Woodland Trust.

References

Forests and woodlands of Kent